This is a list of Marathi cinema actors. Marathi cinema refers to Indian films produced in Marathi, the language of the state of Maharashtra, India. Based in old Mumbai, it is the oldest and one of the pioneer film industries of India.

thumb|190px|
Varsha Usgaonkar
thumb|180px|
Sai Tamhankar
thumb|180px|
Subodh Bhave

A
 
 Arun Sarnaik
 Amol Kolhe
 Ashok Saraf
 Arun Sarnaik
 Akash Thosar 
 Amruta Khanvilkar 
 Anant Jog 
 Aniket Vishwasrao
 Ankita Lokhande 
 Alka Kubal
 Ajinkya Dev
 Adinath Kothare
 Ashok Shinde

B

 Raqesh Bapat
 Sunil Barve
 Laxmikant Berde
 Nitish Bharadwaj
 Ramesh Bhatkar
 Subodh Bhave
 Nagesh Bhonsle
 Prarthana Behere
 Mukta Barve
 Monalisa Bagal
 Sanskruti Balgude
 Aadesh Bandekar
 Ashwini Bhave
 Priya Arun
 Priya Bapat  
 Sudesh Bhosale

C

 Abhijeet Chavan
 Vijay Chavan
 Samir Choughule
 Ankush Chaudhari
 Bhargavi Chirmule
 Usha Chavan
 Nikhil Chavan

D

 Prashant Damle
 Ramesh Deo
 Purushottam Laxman Deshpande
 Ajinkya Deo
 Mrunmayee Deshpande
 Ranjana Deshmukh

G

 Milind Gawali
 Chandrakant Gokhale
 Gaurav more
 Mohan Gokhale
 Vikram Gokhale
 Ashutosh Gowariker
 Milind Gunaji
 Jayshree Gadkar
 Raja Gosavi

J

 Bharat Jadhav
 Siddhartha Jadhav
 Anant Jog
 Jitendra Joshi
 Mohan Joshi
 Sudhir Joshi
 Vidyadhar Joshi
 Swwapnil Joshi
 Santosh Juvekar
 Spruha Joshi
 Pratiksha Jadhav
 Asawari Joshi
 Neha Joshi
 Nivedita Joshi-Saraf
 Archana Joglekar
 Usha Jadhav
 Pushkar Jog

K 
Manoj Kolhatkar

 Girish Karnad
 Yatin Karyekar
 Sharad Kelkar
 Umesh Kamat
 Sachin Khedekar
 Viju Khote
 Dada Kondke
 Mahesh Kothare
 Atul Kulkarni
 Chandrakant Kulkarni
 Umesh Kamat
 Amruta Khanvilkar
 Urmila Kanitkar
 Madhu Kambikar
 Mrinal Kulkarni
 Amita Khopkar
 Sonali Kulkarni
 Sonalee Kulkarni
 Shashank Ketkar 
 Kishor Kadam
 Sandeep Kulkarni

L 

 Shreeram Lagoo
 Kavita Lad
 Upendra Limaye
 Sulochana Latkar

M

 Chandrakant Mandare
 Vaibhav Mangle
 Mahesh Manjrekar 
 Makarand Anaspure
 Chinmay Mandlekar
 Medha Manjrekar
 Madhuri Dixit
 Sanjay Mone
 Ravindra Mankani
 Shahu Modak
 Ravindra Mahajani
 Gashmeer Mahajani
 Shruti Marathe
 Priya Marathe
 Chinmay Mandlekar
 Neha Mahajan
 Milind Shinde
 Mrinal Kulkarni
 Manoj Joshi
 Manasi Naik
 Mohan Agashe
 Mohan Joshi
 Mrunmayee Deshpande
 Makarand Deshpande

N

 Arun Nalawade
 Sanjay Narvekar 
 Usha Nadkarni
 Usha Naik
 Kishore Nandlaskar
 Nagraj Manjule
 Nilesh Sabale
 Nanabhau More
 Nagesh Bhosale
 Nana Patekar

O

 Prasad Oak
 Girish Oak

P

 Amol Palekar
 Prabhakar Panshikar
 Raja Paranjape
 Nana Patekar
 Ganpat Patil
 Vijay Patkar
 Kuldeep Pawar
 Nilu Phule
 Sachin Pilgaonkar
 Supriya Pilgaonkar
 Navin Prabhakar
 Dilip Prabhavalkar
 Sharad Ponkshe
 Prathamesh Parab
 Pradeep Patwardhan
 Tejashri Pradhan
 Sandeep Pathak
 Sachit Patil
 Lalit Prabhakar
 Vaidehi Parashurami
 Prasad Oak
 Pravin Tarde
 Pooja Sawant
 Parth Bhalerao
 Vijay Patwardhan

R

 Riteish Deshmukh
 Satish Rajwade
 Siddharth Ray
 Rinku Rajguru
 Piyush Ranade
 Nikhil Raut

S
 
 Sadashiv Amrapurkar
 Shivaji Satam
 Ashok Shinde
 Deepak Shirke
 Rajesh Shringarpure
 Pushkar Shrotri
 Milind Soman
 Sanjay Shejwal
 Sayaji Shinde
 Shivani Surve
 Sukanya Kulkarni
 Pooja Sawant
 Rajesh Shringarpure
 Nirmiti Sawant
 Kishori Shahane 
 Renuka Shahane
 Sameer Dharmadhikari
 Sachin Pilgaonkar
 Sandeep Pathak 
 Shashank Shende
 Santosh Juvekar

T

 Sai Tamhankar
 Resham Tipnis
 Shilpa Tulaskar
 Smita Talvalkar
 Uday Tikekar
 Sharad Talwalkar
 Madhukar Toradmal

U 
 Varsha Usgaonkar

V 

 Vinay Apte
 Vaibhav Tatwawadi
 Vishal Nikam
 Vikas Patil

W

 Mayuri Wagh
 Sneha Wagh

References

Marathi actors
Marathi actors